Al-Khaṭṭāb ibn Nufayl was an Arab chief from the tribe of Quraysh. He lived during the 6th century and was a contemporary of the Islamic prophet Muhammad. His son Umar would later become Muslim, and would come to be regarded by Sunni Muslims as the second "Rightly guided Caliph" (Arabic "Rashidun"). Thus, he was the ancestor of a good number of the companions of the Prophet.

Biography
Al-Khattab was the son of Nufayl ibn Abd al-Uzza. His father was the chief of Banu Adi clan of Quraysh. After the death of his father, he succeeded him as the chief of Banu Adi.

Al-Khattab also have a brother who died young, his name was Amr ibn Nufayl. His brother had a son Zayd. He had good relations with his tribesmen and kins. However his relation with his nephew Zayd ibn Amr started gradually deteriorate because his nephew had denied the subordinate gods to Allāh and he embraced strict monotheism. This angered many members of Nufayl family and Banu Adi clan.

Zayd's wife Safiya disliked his travels to Syria. Whenever she saw him preparing for a journey, she reported it to al-Khattab, who would reproach Zayd for abandoning their religion. Zayd did not bother to explain himself to al-Khattab, but he rebuked Safiya for trying to humiliate him. 
Al-Khattab harassed Zayd so severely that Zayd was forced to leave the city. He spent the last few years of his life in the mountain-caves surrounding Mecca. Al-Khattab then instructed the "young irresponsible men of the Quraysh" to ensure that Zayd could never enter the city again. Whenever Zayd tried to enter in secret, al-Khattab's men drove him out again.

One time, his nephew Zayd ibn Amr taunted him for worshiping idols.

He had a son, Umar. His other children included a daughter, Fatimah bint al-Khattab, and a son Zayd ibn al-Khattab. The daughter married the hanif Said ibn Zayd, and later would both become Muslims. However, they hid their new faith from al-Khattab and Umar. Al-Khattab died between 614 and 616.

In accounts preserved by al-Yahsubi (d. 1149), al-Khattab converted to Islam.

Family
Al-Khattab was the relative of many Companions of Muhammad.

 Wife
 Hantamah bint Hisham, she belongs to the wealthy clan of Quraysh Banu Makhzum.
 Asma bint Wahb, was the second wife of al-Khattab
Children
The children of al-Khattab are:
Umar ibn al-Khattab, he was the elder son of Hantamah and Al-Khattab
Fatimah bint al-Khattab, daughter of Hantamah and Al-Khattab
Zayd ibn al-Khattab, he was the son of Al-Khattab and his second wife Asma bint Wahb.
Daughters and sons-in-law
 Sa'id bin Zayd
 Zaynab bint Madhun, she married Umar before 605
 Umm Kulthum bint Jarwal, she married Umar ibn al-Khattab before 616,
 Qurayba bint Abi Umayya, she married Umar before 616.
Grandchildren
 Hafsa bint Umar
 Abdullah ibn Umar
 Ubaydullah ibn Umar
 Zayd ibn Umar
 Asim ibn Umar, famous early Muslim scholar.
 Abdurrahman ibn Sa'id ibn Zayd, also known as Zayd Abdur Rahman the Elder, was the son of her daughter Fatima.

References

External links
https://web.archive.org/web/20120717072558/http://www.sunnahonline.com/ilm/seerah/0019.htm

Umar
6th-century Arabs
Banu Adi
People from Mecca